The women's discus throw event at the 1974 British Commonwealth Games was held on 26 January at the Queen Elizabeth II Park in Christchurch, New Zealand.

Medalists

Results

Qualification

Final
Held on 26 January.

References

Athletics at the 1974 British Commonwealth Games
1974